The Royal Montreal Curling Club (French: Club de Curling Royal Montréal) is the oldest curling club in  North America, established on January 27, 1807 by a group of Scottish Canadian immigrants in Montreal.

The group met at the Gillis Tavern to lay down the rules of the organization. Thirty years later, the group would again make Canadian sports history, by building Canada's first indoor ice rink.

In addition to its status as the oldest curling club on the continent, the Royal Montreal Curling Club is also the oldest active sports club in North America.

References

External links

See also
 Milwaukee Curling Club, oldest continuously operating curling club in the United States

Curling clubs in Canada
Organizations established in 1807
Sport in Montreal
History of Montreal
Organizations based in Montreal
Quebec Anglophone culture in Montreal
Sports clubs established in the 1800s
1807 establishments in Canada
Curling in Quebec
Scottish-Canadian culture